Ethan King Strimling (born October 19, 1967) is an American non-profit executive and politician from Maine. Strimling was elected Mayor of Portland, Maine in 2015. Strimling previously served as a Democratic state senator from 2003 to 2009. After leaving the Maine Senate, he was the Executive Director of LearningWorks, a West End non-profit organization, and has served as a political columnist and commentator for the Portland Press Herald.

Early life
Ethan Strimling was born and raised in New York City and attended the Juilliard School for Theater from 1985 to 1987. Later, he attended the University of Maine and received his B.A. in History. He then pursued a master's degree in education from Harvard University and received it in 1994. He is Jewish.

After school, he went to Washington, D.C. to work as a legislative aide for then-First District Congressman Tom Andrews. He then came back to Maine to serve as State Senator Dale McCormick's Campaign Manager for her 1996 Congressional race.

Strimling began serving as the Executive Director of Portland West, a non-profit social-service agency that works with at-risk kids and low-income families in Portland's West End, in 1997. Strimling has also served on the boards of several political and non-profit committees, including Maine Won't Discriminate, Casinos NO!, and the Maine NAACP.

Political career
Strimling's first run for public office was for the Portland City Council in 1999. He was defeated by incumbent Jack Dawson by just 24 votes. During a recount, the City Council awarded 35 disputed ballots to Strimling after his campaign argued that voters who filled in a blank line below his name had intended to vote for him. When Dawson appealed the decision to Maine Superior Court, Strimling announced that he would step aside and give Dawson the council seat.

In 2002, Strimling ran his first campaign for the Maine State Senate to succeed Anne M. Rand. He was elected in his first race with 74% of the vote and again in 2004 with 76%. He was elected for a third term in 2006. In the State Senate, Strimling was the Chair of the Labor Committee and also a member of the Taxation Committee. He has also served as Chair of the Criminal Justice and Public Safety Committee, and in 2006, was Co-Chair of Maine's Homeland Security Task Force.

In 2008, when Democratic Congressman Tom Allen announced that he would challenge U.S. Senator Susan Collins, Strimling declared that he would run for Maine's 1st congressional district. In the June 10 Democratic primary, Strimling finished fourth with 5,833 votes (out of 55,382 votes cast). He was succeeded in the Maine Senate by fellow Democrat Justin Alfond.

In February 2010, when Strimling was appointed to the New England board of the Anti-Defamation League, he became the first Maine resident to be appointed to the position.

On July 26, 2011, Strimling formally announced he was running for Mayor of Portland. Fellow former State Senator Michael F. Brennan won the election.

Strimling and former Republican State Senator Phil Harriman wrote the "Agree to Disagree" column on the Bangor Daily News website, which was named the "2013 Best State Political Blog" by The Washington Post. They are also political analysts for WCSH TV, working in tandem. On May 23, 2014, Strimling and Harriman wrote the last Daily News column and started writing their column for the Portland Press Herald on May 25. Strimling also is an analyst for WGAN radio.

On August 18, 2015, Strimling announced his intention to launch a second campaign for Mayor of Portland in the 2015 election on November 3, 2015. He won the race without needing an instant runoff, obtaining 51% of the vote. Incumbent Mayor Michael Brennan conceded the race at about 10 PM on election night. 

Strimling announced his intention to seek a second term as Mayor in the 2019 Portland, Maine mayoral election on June 23, 2019. Strimling lost to Kate Snyder.

In 2020, Strimling played a leading role in People First Portland, a campaign to pass five municipal ballot initiatives to raise the minimum wage to $15 an hour, enact rent control, ban facial recognition surveillance, limit short term rentals, and a Green New Deal. Four out of five initiatives passed (only the short-term rentals limit failed) despite being outspent by the Portland business community and the opposition of Mayor Kate Snyder.

In 2021 Strimling funded a Push Poll showing Maine Senate President Troy Jackson leading former governor Paul LePage in a hypothetical matchup in the 2022 Maine gubernatorial election with current Governor of Maine Janet Mills also polled against LePage.

Personal life 
Strimling and Mary Beeaker were married from 2004-2017. Strimling’s affair with his campaign manager, Stephanie Clifford, led to the end of both their marriages. He has no children and resides in Portland, Maine.

Electoral results
2008 Democratic Primary for Congress - 1st District
Chellie Pingree 44%
Adam Cote 28%
Michael Brennan 11%
Ethan Strimling 11%
Mark Lawrence 5%
Stephen Meister 1%
2011 Mayoral
Michael Brennan 26.76%
Ethan Strimling 22.42%
Nicholas Mavodones 15.00%
David A. Marshall 7.74%
Jed Rathband 7.12%
Jill Duson 4.26%
Markos Miller 3.67%
Richard Dodge 3.42%
Christopher Vail 2.06%
Peter Bryant 1.87%
John Eder 1.38%
Charles Bragdon 1.09%
Hamza Haadoow 0.94%
Jodie Lapchick 0.65%
Note: Through 14 rounds of instant runoffs, Brennan extended the lead he built on Election Day. During the retabulation process, second choice votes for lower ranked candidates were systematically reallocated to higher ranked candidates until an individual claimed more than 50 percent of the total.
2015 Mayoral
Ethan Strimling	51.1%
Michael Brennan	38.4%
Thomas MacMillan      10.5%
Note: Total Votes 17,924. Ranked choice runoff was not in effect as Strimling broke 50 percent in round 1.

References

External links 
Maine Legislature - Senator Ethan Strimling (official government site)
Maine Senate Democrats - Senator Ethan Strimling
Project Vote Smart - Senator Ethan King Strimling (ME) profile
Follow the Money - Ethan King Strimling
2006 2004 2002 campaign contributions
Profile at SourceWatch

1967 births
Living people
Harvard Graduate School of Education alumni
Jewish American state legislators in Maine
Jewish mayors of places in the United States
Juilliard School alumni
Democratic Party Maine state senators
Mayors of Portland, Maine
Politicians from New York City
Radio personalities from Maine
University of Maine alumni
21st-century American politicians
Jews and Judaism in Portland, Maine
21st-century American Jews